Wong Wai Hong (born 31 March 1986) is a badminton player from Hong Kong. In 2010, he became the runner-up at the Polish International tournament in the men's doubles event partnered with Yohan Hadikusumo Wiratama. In 2011, he won the Austrian International tournament in the mixed doubles event partnered with Chau Hoi Wah. In 2012, Wong and his partner repeat their success in Austria. Partnering with Chan Yun Lung in the men's doubles, he became the runner-up at the 2013 Vietnam International tournament.

Achievements

BWF Grand Prix 
The BWF Grand Prix has two levels, the Grand Prix and Grand Prix Gold. It is a series of badminton tournaments sanctioned by the Badminton World Federation (BWF) since 2007.

Men's doubles

  BWF Grand Prix Gold tournament
  BWF Grand Prix tournament

BWF International Challenge/Series 
Men's doubles

Mixed doubles

  BWF International Challenge tournament
  BWF International Series tournament

References

External links 
 Wong Wai Hong at BadmintonLink.com
 

1986 births
Living people
Hong Kong male badminton players
Badminton players at the 2006 Asian Games
Badminton players at the 2010 Asian Games
Badminton players at the 2014 Asian Games
Asian Games competitors for Hong Kong